Christopher Mario Johnson (born September 25, 1979) is a former American football cornerback in the National Football League (NFL). He was drafted by the Green Bay Packers in the seventh round of the 2003 NFL Draft. He played college football at Louisville. Johnson played for the Packers for two seasons, the St. Louis Rams in 2005, the Oakland Raiders for five seasons from 2007 to 2011 and the Baltimore Ravens for one season in 2012.

Early life and collegiate career
Johnson was born in Gladewater, Texas. At Pine Tree High School, Johnson started in the football team; during his senior season, he intercepted 12 passes and helped the team reach a 7-3 record. Johnson attended Blinn College in Brenham, Texas and transferred to the University of Louisville, where he was a letterman for two years and majored in administration of justice. At Louisville, Johnson had 44 total tackles (32 solo), one tackle for a loss, and seven defended passes. In the 2001 Liberty Bowl, his first-ever major bowl game, Johnson started and intercepted a pass in the waning minutes of the fourth quarter to seal the Louisville Cardinals victory over the BYU Cougars 28-10.

Professional career

Green Bay Packers
Johnson was drafted in the seventh round (245th overall) of the 2003 NFL Draft by the Green Bay Packers.

St. Louis Rams
Johnson was traded to the St. Louis Rams in exchange for linebacker Robert Thomas during the 2005 NFL season. He played in 14 games, starting one and recorded 24 tackles (23 solo). He also had 38 kickoff returns for 857 yards (22.6 avg.) and a 99-yard touchdown return.

Kansas City Chiefs
Johnson signed with the Kansas City Chiefs during the 2006 off-season but was released before that season.

Oakland Raiders
On March 19, 2007, he signed with the Raiders. He played in 13 games at cornerback and special teams, contributing 10 special teams tackles and one solo tackle, two assists and two passes defensed at cornerback. In 2008, after six seasons in the NFL, Johnson recorded his first interception in a game against the San Diego Chargers, picking off quarterback Philip Rivers while covering wideout Buster Davis. Johnson was named a starter after the Raiders waived cornerback DeAngelo Hall. He recorded his second career interception when he picked off Kansas City Chiefs quarterback Tyler Thigpen.

In 2009, he signed a 4-year, $11.3 million contract with the Oakland Raiders. He was released by the Raiders following the 2011 season on March 9, 2012.

Baltimore Ravens
On November 13, 2012, Johnson signed with the Baltimore Ravens as a backup. The Ravens had already received injuries to corners Lardarius Webb and Jimmy Smith earlier in the year. In his first appearance in Week 11 against the Pittsburgh Steelers, he forced a fumble by Mike Wallace early in the first quarter which was recovered by Ed Reed. The Ravens would win 13–10. Johnson won the only Super Bowl of his career that year. On August 19, 2013, Johnson was cut by the Ravens.

References

1979 births
Living people
African-American players of American football
American football cornerbacks
American football return specialists
Baltimore Ravens players
Blinn Buccaneers football players
Green Bay Packers players
Kansas City Chiefs players
Louisville Cardinals football players
Oakland Raiders players
People from Longview, Texas
Players of American football from Texas
St. Louis Rams players
People from Gladewater, Texas
21st-century African-American sportspeople
20th-century African-American sportspeople